Moikodi, or Doriri, is a Papuan language spoken in Oro Province, in the "tail" of Papua New Guinea. Half of speakers are monolingual.

References 

Languages of Papua New Guinea
Languages of Oro Province
Yareban languages